The European Technology Exposure Facility (EuTEF) was a payload mounted on the exterior of the European Columbus laboratory, one of the modules of the International Space Station. The facility, mounted onto the exterior of Columbus, provided a platform for multiple types of experiments and materials to be exposed directly to the harsh space environment.

The EuTEF is a programmable, multifunctional architecture that provides uniform interfaces for instruments. Nine instrument modules are accommodated and operated simultaneously. Each experiment is mounted on the Columbus External Payload Adapter (CEPA), which consists of an adapter plate, the Active Flight Releasable Attachment Mechanism (A-FRAM) and the connectors & harness. The experiments are mounted either directly onto the adapter plate or a support structure that elevates them for optimum exposure to the ram (direction of flight) and zenith directions.

The first set of experiments (successfully mounted during STS-122 and removed during STS-128) mounted to the facility included:
DEBris In-orbit Evaluator (DEBIE-2): micrometeoroid and orbital debris detector
EuTEF Thermometer (EuTEMP): measure EuTEF's thermal environment
Earth Viewing Camera (EVC): Earth observing camera
Exposure experiment (EXPOSE): An exobiological exposure facility
Flux(Phi) Probe EXperiment (FIPEX): atomic oxygen detector
Material Exposure and Degradation Experiment (MEDET): examine material degradation
Plasma Electron Gun Payload (PLEGPAY): plasma discharge in orbit
An Experiment on Space Tribology Experiment (Tribolab): testbed for the tribology (study of friction on moving parts) properties of materials

See also
Scientific research on the ISS

References

External links
 EuTEF brochure - ESA
 EUTEF - European Technology Exposure Facility - Carlo Gavazzi Space

Columbus (ISS module)
Science facilities on the International Space Station
Space exposure experiments